The Bowling Green Falcons football program is the intercollegiate football team of Bowling Green State University. The team is a member of the NCAA, playing at the Division I Football Bowl Subdivision, formerly Division I-A, level; BGSU football competes within the Mid-American Conference in the East Division. The Falcons have played their home games in Doyt Perry Stadium since 1966. The stadium holds 24,000 spectators. In their 93-year history, the Falcons have won 12 MAC championships and a College Division national championship – as voted by the UPI in 1959. The head coach is Scot Loeffler.

History

Early history (1919–1967)
The football program was born shortly after the university opened, at the time known as the Bowling Green Normal School. In the early years of Bowling Green State Normal College, common nicknames of BG athletic teams used by sports writers were “B.G. Normals,” “Teachers,” and the “B.G. Pedagogues". The team began play in 1919 and played on a local field behind the Ridge Street School in Bowling Green, Ohio. The first team was composed of nineteen male students, over half of the 36 men that enrolled in the college. The roster included Ivan "Doc" Lake, who would later would give the Falcons their nickname. John Stitt served as the program's first football coach during the initial 3-game 1919 season. The first football game in BG's history was held on October 3, 1919 against Toledo University, a series that would turn into a rivalry that still exists in the present day. The game ended with a 6–0 score. The second game of the season marked BG's first road game at Defiance College, where the team dropped to 0–2 with a 12–0 shutout. In the final game of the short season the team lost to Michigan State Normal College (Eastern Michigan) 10–0. In the 1920 season, BG recorded its first score in a 10-6 loss at Findlay College. The 1920 team later recorded the program's first win, in the eighth and final game of the season, when the team defeated Kent State Normal College 7–0. 

The team joined the Northwest Ohio League starting in the 1921 season. In the first game BG and Kent battled to a scoreless tie in a game that saw no fan attendance due to influenza epidemic. After a 7–0 win over Defiance, BG faced Findlay on October 15, 1921 in a game that set a national collegiate record in which BG scored 22 touchdowns to win 151–0 over Findlay College. Despite dropping the following game 27–0 to Ashland College, the team finished the season with a record of 3–1–1 and won the Northwest Ohio League conference championship, the first title in school history. The team would repeat as the NWOIAA Champions in 1922, 1925, 1928 and 1929.

Warren Steller became the head coach of BG in 1924 and in his second season as head coach, BG recorded its first one-loss season in 1925. The record was repeated two seasons later, in 1927, when the team dropped its final game of the season 12–6 to Bluffton. During the same season, Ivan "Doc" Lake, a BG alumnus and football player on the original team, suggested the nickname “Falcons”. The nickname's popularity grew rapidly and was adopted by the school. In 1928, the Falcons recorded their first undefeated season with a record of 5–0–2. The team was led by Chet Chapman, who received the conference MVP award and also became Bowling Green's first All-American. Steller's Falcons repeated the feat just a few seasons later, in 1930, when the team went 6–0–2. The 1931 season marked the team's final year that the Falcons participated in the Northwest Ohio League. The team joined the Ohio Athletic Conference (OAC) in 1933, after it played one season as an independent team. Warren Steller's last season as head coach of BG football came in 1934. In the years after he continued to serve as the manager of the baseball team and also served as athletic director until 1941.

The Falcons struggled in their initial seasons as a member of the OAC, when the team recorded a losing record in three straight seasons from 1933–35. The first winning record came in 1936 when the Falcons finished the season with a record of 4–2–3. In 1937, University Stadium was dedicated as the team's home stadium. The venue was located in the northeast part of campus and replaced the field and wooden bleachers with a larger capacity, permanent structure with the aid of Federal funding part of the Works Progress Administration. The new stadium did not provide much home field advantage, with BG only recording two home wins and ending the season 3–4–1. One of the team's best seasons in the OAC came in 1939 when BG finished with a record of 6–1–1. The Falcons came within a point of an undefeated season, their only loss to Capital by the score of 7–6. Robert Whittaker became head coach in 1941 and guided the Falcons to their best record as a member of the Ohio Athletic Conference when the team outscored opponents by a combined score of 173–40 and recorded a 7–1–1 overall record; and finished as one of four undefeated teams in conference play with a conference record of 4–0–1, along with Case Institute of Technology, Ohio Northern and Toledo. From 1942 until 1952 The team played independent of a conference affiliation until the university joined the Mid-American Conference (MAC). The highlight of BG's independent years came in 1948 when the Falcons went 8–0–1. The only blemish on the season came at the hands of John Carroll, when the teams battled to tie score of 13–13. Bowling Green had initial success in the new conference and finished with a record of 7–2 in the 1952 season.
The only losses on the season to Miami (OH) and Ohio. The success of the first MAC season was short-lived with Bowling Green only winning 3 games over the next two seasons; and in 1955, Doyt Perry replaced Whittaker as head coach.

Perry, who attended Bowling Green and was a three-sport athlete for the Falcons and the captain of the football, basketball and baseball teams in 1931–32 returned to Bowling Green after serving as a high school coach at Upper Arlington and the offensive backfield coach of Ohio State. Perry changed the culture of the program, and focused on decreases in mistakes, penalties, fumbles, interceptions, blocked kicks and missed assignments. With the new coach and coaching style, the team's record quickly turned around and finished with a 7–1–1 record Perry's first season as head coach. In that season, the team's only loss came to the Miami RedHawks by the score of 7–0. The team outscored opponents 224–53, compared to being outscored 125–196 in the 1954 season. The team continued success into the 1956 season and recorded seven straight victories before picking up a 7–7 tie vs. Miami (OH) and finishing the season with an eight win on the season for a final unbeaten record of 8–0–1 and Bowling Green's first MAC Championship. After two successful seasons in 1957 and 1958, in which the Falcons went 13–3–2 overall between the two season, The season included conference wins over Miami, Kent State, Ohio, Toledo, and Western Michigan and non-conference opponents of Dayton, Delaware, Marshall, and Southern Illinois. BG recorded two games where the team scored 51 points, and the closest game of the season was a 13–9 win over Ohio in the last game of the season on November 21. Bowling Green finished the year with a perfect record of 9–0–0 and were named the Mid-American Conference Champions and National Champions in the NCAA College Division. The next season, the Falcons began the season with a 5–0 record that included wins over MAC rivals Miami, Toledo and Kent State. And on October 29, 1960, the team got a sixth straight win on the season and seventeenth straight victory overall, beating California Polytechnic 50–6. Shortly after the victory, news spread that the Mustangs' plane crashed on takeoff when leaving Toledo. Two weeks later, the team faced Ohio University in a rematch of the championship-clinching game in the 1959 season. The Bobcats snapped the team's eighteen-game win streak and ended the team's chance at a second consecutive national title. With the 14–7 win, the Bobcats earned the MAC Championship and 1960 NCAA College Division National Championship. The Falcons went on to beat Texas-El Paso and finished the season with an 8–1 record, ranked second in the MAC. The 1961 team finishing the regular season with an 8–1 record in the regular season, the single loss to Miami (OH) by one point, 7–6. Despite the loss, the Falcons claimed their third MAC title and was selected to play in the Mercy Bowl, the program's first bowl game. The team flew to California to play Fresno State at the Los Angeles Memorial Coliseum. Proceeds of the game went to the survivors and families of the Cal Poly plane crash. The Falcons lost the game 36–6 but over $170,000 was raised for the victims.

Bowling Green repeated as MAC champions in 1962, and finished the season with a record of 7–1–1 with a 24–24 tie at Miami (OH) and a 23–7 non-conference road loss to West Texas State. In the 1963 season, Bowling Green ended with a record of 8–2, including a home loss to Miami Redskins and a road loss at Ohio. The Falcons started the 1964 season on an eight-game winning streak. In the ninth game of the season, Bowling Green faced tough rival, Ohio and was held scoreless with the Bobcats winning 21–0. The team rebounded in the final game of the season to beat Xavier 35–7 and claimed the MAC Championship. BG finished the season with a 9–1 record and outscored opponents 275–87. Perry stepped down as head coach of the football team after the 1964 season to take a position as the athletic director at the university and served in the position until 1970. He finished with an overall record of 77–11–5 and a conference record of 46–8–5 over ten seasons. During Perry's tenure at Bowling Green, he won five Mid-American Conference Championships and one NCAA College Division National Championship. His .855 winning percentage placed Perry among the top five in college football history and he was inducted to the College Football Hall of Fame in 1988. Bob Gibson, a long-time assistant coach at BG, was hired to replace Perry as head coach of the Falcons. In the 1965 season the team again won another MAC title with a 7–2 record. The Falcons continued their winning ways under Gibson in 1966 and 1967, posting records of 6–3 and 6–4 respectively. Gibson departed Bowling Green after the 1967 season with a 19–9 record.

Don Nehlen era (1968–1976)

After one season as an assistant coach to Gibson, Don Nehlen took over as head coach for the Falcons in 1968. Nehlen played quarterback at Bowling Green from 1955 to 1957 and led the team to the 1956 MAC championship. After graduating from BG, he began his coaching career in 1958 at Mansfield Senior High School. He later served as head coach at Canton South High School and Canton McKinley High School and an assistant coach at the University of Cincinnati. The Falcons welcomed Nehlen in as head coach with a 62–8 win over Ball State and opened the 1968 season on a three-game win streak. The team finished the season 6–3–1 and followed with a 6–4 record in the 1969 season. Despite a 2–6–1 record in the 1970 season, Bowling Green rebounded back to a 6–4 record in 1971.

The Falcons began Nehlen's fifth season as head coach against Purdue on September 16, 1972. The game was tied in the fourth quarter when the Falcons moved into field goal range and Don Taylor kicked the ball through the uprights to give the Falcons a 17–14 upset win against a top 20 ranked opponent. In the 1973 season, BG again picked up a big opening win, at Syracuse 41–14. The Falcons' rushing game greatly improved under Nehlen. The team was led by Paul Miles, who ran for more than 1,000 yards in three consecutive seasons from 1971 to 1973. Miles teammate, Dave Preston earned a position as the career leader in rushing with 3,423 yards during his time with the Falcons. In 1975, Dan Saleet rushed for a team leading 1,114 yards. Nehlen led the Falcons added two more upsets in the Nehlen era with a 23–21 win over BYU and a 22–7 win against Syracuse in 1975 and 1976 respectively. The major wins gave Nehlen the unofficial title of the “Master of the Upset” from many BGSU fans. Nehlen left Bowling Green after the 1976 season and guided the Falcons to a 53–35–4 record in nine seasons as head coach. He went on to coach at West Virginia and coached 21 seasons for the Mountaineers and became the 17th coach in NCAA Division I-A history to record 200 victories with a 202–128–8 overall record.

Denny Stolz era (1977–1985)
Former Michigan State head coach Denny Stolz was hired as the 12th head coach of the Bowling Green Falcons in 1977. He coached the team to a 22–33–1 in his first five seasons, with the first four having exactly seven losses. But in his sixth season, he coached them to a MAC title, their first since 1965, culminating with an appearance in the California Bowl, their first ever bowl game appearance. His next two seasons were both 8–3 but with no MAC titles, finishing 2nd twice.

In Stolz's final season, the Falcons went 11–0 in the regular season, won the MAC title, and appeared in the California Bowl once again. Stolz left his Bowling Green team out in California and never got the Falcons ready to play vs Fresno State and the Falcons were beaten for the first time all season and ended 11–1, while Stolz went to San Diego to coach San Diego State, leaving BGSU after two MAC titles and a 56–45–1 record, going 34–12–0 in his last four seasons.

Moe Ankney era (1986–1990)
Arizona defensive coordinator and associate head coach Moe Ankney was hired as the 13th head coach of the Falcons after Stolz's departure. Ironically, despite finishing 5–6 in his first two years, they had finished tied for 2nd in the MAC. But the bottom fell out in his third season, with his team going 2–8–1 and finishing eighth out of nine teams. His next two seasons were only marginally better, finishing 5–6 and 3–5–2. After five losing seasons, Ankney resigned to become defensive coordinator at Purdue, finishing with a record of 20–31–3.

Gary Blackney era (1991–2000) 
Ohio State linebackers coach Gary Blackney was hired as the 14th head coach of the Falcons in 1990. His first season ended with a 10–1 regular season, MAC title, a win in the California Bowl which was their first ever bowl win. The next season proved to be even better, as the team finished with a 2nd straight MAC title, a 9–2 regular season, and a Las Vegas Bowl victory. In 1994, his team came within one game of winning a third MAC title, before a loss to Central Michigan on a fake punt touchdown. Blackney's Falcons finished 9–2 in 1994. In his first four seasons, Blackney had coached the Falcons to a 36–8–2 record.

But after the Central Michigan debacle that ended that season, Blackney's record in the next six seasons was a paltry 24–42, with his last season being the worst, as they finished 2–9. Four games in with an 0–4 start, Blackney decided to quit as soon as the season ended, leaving the Falcons after compiling a 60–50–2 record.

Urban Meyer era (2001–2002)

In 2001, Notre Dame wide receivers coach Urban Meyer took his first head coaching job at Bowling Green. In his first season there, the team finished 8–3, capping off the season with a 56–21 victory over Bowling Green's rival, the University of Toledo Rockets. Meyer also earned Mid-American Conference Coach of the Year honors that season.

The next year, Bowling Green finished with a 9–3 record. After a 17–6 overall record, Meyer left to accept the head coaching position at Utah.
He helped turn around a team that had gone 2–9 in 2000 in large part due to QB Josh Harris, a player tailor-made for Meyer's scheme. In part-time play in 2001, Harris threw for 1,022 yards with 9 touchdowns, and ran for 600 yards and 8 touchdowns. The next year, he threw for 2,425 yards with 19 TD and ran for 737 yards with 20 TD. Meyer later used such quarterbacks as Alex Smith at Utah and Tim Tebow at Florida in a fashion similar to the way Meyer used Harris.

Gregg Brandon era (2003–2008)
After Meyer left for Utah, offensive coordinator Gregg Brandon was promoted to serve as the 16th head coach of the Falcons. In his first season as Bowling Green's head coach, Brandon led his team to an 11–3 record and a division title, appearing in the 2003 MAC title game, losing to Miami (OH). But the Falcons would play in the 2003 Motor City Bowl and win, finishing the season ranked at No. 23.While the next season was only good enough for 3rd in the MAC West, they finished 9–3 and played in the 2004 GMAC Bowl, the first time the Falcons went to consecutive bowl games since 1992.

They moved to the MAC East after the season, and finished the next two years 2nd and 4th respectively, with the latter being his only losing season at 4–8 in 2006. The following year, they shared the MAC East title while finishing 8–5, losing out on playing in the MAC title game due to a tiebreaker. Instead, they played in the 2007 GMAC Bowl. The 2008 season proved to be his final year in which they finished 6–6 after high expectations, being fired after his last game, a win against Toledo. Brandon finished 44–30, with two division titles but no MAC titles.

Dave Clawson era (2009–2013)

Dave Clawson had been offensive coordinator at Tennessee prior to being hired as the 17th head coach of the Falcons. His first year ended with a 7–6 record and a loss in the 2009 Humanitarian Bowl, though they played in their first bowl game in three seasons. 2010 was disastrous, as the team went 2–10. They improved to 5–7 the following year, with a marginal rise in division position.

In January 2010, rumors began to circulate that East Carolina was interested in Clawson for their vacant head coaching position, following former ECU coach Skip Holtz' move to South Florida. The rumors intensified following Middle Tennessee State's head coach Rick Stockstill turning down the East Carolina job after interviewing. However, Bowling Green stated that neither athletic director Greg Christopher or Clawson himself  were contacted by East Carolina officials. Ultimately, Ruffin McNeill was hired to fill the position. On November 7, 2012, Clawson led the Falcons to an upset victory against division rival Ohio 26–14. The special teams had two blocked punts and forced two bad snaps which one of them rolled into Ohio's end zone to force a safety.  The Falcons took advantage of these turnovers and scored 19 points (2 Touchdowns, 1 Field Goal, and 1 Safety).  With the win, BG moved into 2nd place in the MAC East Division and kept their hopes alive of winning the MAC East and better yet the entire conference. They went to the 2012 Military Bowl after an 8–5 record, as expectations rose for next season. 2013 proved to be the culmination of the expectations, as the team not only won the MAC East, they also won the MAC title over Northern Illinois, their first MAC title since 1992. The team finished with a 10–4 record. Four days after winning the MAC title, Clawson left to be the next coach at Wake Forest, leaving the interim head coaching duties for the 2013 Little Caesars Pizza Bowl to special teams coordinator Adam Scheier. He left the program with a 32–31 record, a MAC title, but no bowl wins.

Dino Babers era (2014–2015)
Eastern Illinois head coach Dino Babers was hired as the 18th head football coach of the Falcons in December 2013. Babers is the first African American head coach in Bowling Green football history. Bowling Green went 8–4 in his first year with the program, winning the MAC East once again, though they lost the MAC title game to Northern Illinois, ending the regular season on a three-game losing streak. However, they did appear in the 2014 Camellia Bowl and won. It was their first bowl win since 2004. In 2015 Babers coached the team to a 10–4 record, winning the 2015 MAC Championship against Northern Illinois. Babers left the program in December 2015 to accept the head coaching position at Syracuse.

Mike Jinks era (2016–2018)

Texas Tech running backs coach Mike Jinks was hired to replace Babers. In Jinks' first season, the Falcons finished 4–8. In his second season, the Falcons only accomplished 2 wins to their 10 losses. In what would be his final season, the Jinks' led Falcons were 1-6 after falling to Western Michigan on October 13 after holding a two touchdown lead with 8:51 left in the third quarter. Jinks was relieved of his duties on October 14, 2018 and finished his stint at Bowling Green with a 7-24 record.

Scot Loeffler era (2019–present)
On November 28, 2018, Boston College offensive coordinator Scot Loeffler was named the 20th head coach at Bowling Green. During this time, the Falcons played their 100th anniversary game against the Toledo Rockets, winning 20-7. The Falcons were 27.5 point underdogs, and pulled off their first victory against Toledo since 2009. BG finished the year 3-9. In his second season, the Falcons didn't win a single game, going 0-5, in a shortened season due to the pandemic. Loeffler would pick up his biggest win as the head coach in 2021 when the Falcons beat the Minnesota Gophers 14-10 at Huntington Bank Stadium. The win would be Bowling Green's first win against an FBS team since 2019. Bowling Green would finish the season with a 4-8 record.

In a September 2022 game against Eastern Kentucky, the Falcons played their longest game with seven overtimes.

Conference affiliations
Bowling Green competes in the East division of the Mid-American Conference. Bowling Green was to move to the West division for the 2012 season, but that never occurred after Temple left the MAC for the Big East prior to the 2012 season.

 Independent (1919–1920)
 Northwest Ohio League (1921–1931)
 Independent (1932)
 Ohio Athletic Conference (1933–1941)
 Independent (1942–1951)
 Mid-American Conference (1952–present)

Championships

National championships
Bowling Green was the 1959 NCAA College Division national champion, as selected by both Associated Press and UPI in the 1959 NCAA College Division football rankings.

Conference championships
Bowling Green has won or shared a conference championship 17 times, including 12 times in the Mid-American Conference.

Division championships
Bowling Green has won six division championships.

† Co-champions

Bowl games
Bowling Green has played in 13 bowl games in its history, compiling a record of 5–8 in those games.

The Falcons also participated in the Mercy Bowl on November 23, 1961, against the Fresno State Bulldogs (losing 36–6) though this game is not recognized as a sanctioned bowl game by the NCAA.

Head coaches

Rivalries
Bowling Green plays the Toledo Rockets for the Peace Pipe in the annual Battle of I-75. Bowling Green's record in games played for the Peace Pipe, which date to 1980, is 15–16. Bowling Green competes against Kent State for the Anniversary Award', which was introduced in 1985.

Kent State

Bowling Green leads the series with Kent State 60–19–6 through the 2017 season.

Toledo

Bowling Green and Toledo have a rivalry, nicknamed "The Battle of I-75", dating back to 1924, when BGSU challenged the participation of Toledo's captain, Gilbert Stick, after it was discovered that Stick also played for a local team in Genoa, Ohio. Conference rules did not prohibit such play, and BGSU's protest was overruled. In 1950, Toledo's athletic director charged BGSU students a higher price for tickets at a basketball game than the general public, while rumors spread of a dog-napping attempt by BGSU against Toledo's mascot. Another incident came in 1951, when a fight broke out after a hard hit by a BGSU player on fullback Mel Triplett. Don Greenwood, then Toledo's coach, participated, and resigned after the university failed to back him up. In Greenwood's view, the officials should have called a penalty for excessive roughness, and he had a duty to protect his players. Following the 2019 season, the all-time series between the two is tied, 40-42-4.

Home venues
 Ridge Street School (1919–1923)
 University Stadium (1923–1965)
 Doyt Perry Stadium (1966–present)

Notable individual award winners

Team and conference MVPs

 1943: Art Mergenthal
 1974: Dave Preston
 1976: Mark Miller
 1977: Mark Miller
 1983: Martin Bayless
 1984: Brian McClure
 1985: Brian McClure
 1991: Erik White
 1992: Erik White
 2002: Josh Harris
 2003: Josh Harris
 2004: Omar Jacobs
 2005: Charles Sharon
 2006: Kory Lichtensteiger
 2007: Kory Lichtensteiger

Mid-American Conference honors

 Player of the Year
1984: Brian McClure
1985: Brian McClure
1991: Erik White
1992: Erik White

 Offensive Player of the Year
1983: Brian McClure
1984: Brian McClure
1985: Brian McClure
1991: Erik White
1992: Erik White
2004: Omar Jacobs

 Defensive Player of the Year
2012: Chris Jones

 Freshman of the Year
1982: Brian McClure

Future non-conference opponents
Announced schedules as of January 27, 2020.

Notable players

 Jude Adjei-Barimah
 Freddie Barnes
 Alex Bayer
 Diyral Briggs
 Khary Campbell
 Shawn Daniels
 Josh Harris
 Ryan Hunter
 Omar Jacobs
 Chris Jones
 Kamar Jorden
 Roger Lewis
 Kory Lichtensteiger
 Gabe Martin
 Art Mergenthal
 Scott Miller
 Scott Mruczkowski
 P.J. Pope
 Teo Redding
 Steve Sanders
 Charles Sharon
 Tyler Sheehan
 Shaun Suisham
 Phil Villapiano
 Erik White

References

External links

 

 
American football teams established in 1919
1919 establishments in Ohio